Abdel Hamid Badawi Pasha (13 March 1887 – 4 August 1965) was born in Alexandria, Egypt. He was a prominent jurisprudent and legislator on both the national and international arenas.

Amongst many of the responsibilities that he undertook in his career in Egypt, he served as Minister of Finance and later as Minister of Foreign Affairs, both in the 1940s. During his term as Minister of Foreign Affairs he headed the Egyptian delegation to the UN in San Francisco and was a co-signor of the UN charter on behalf of Egypt.
  
In 1946, he was selected to serve as Judge at the International Court of Justice where he served until his death on 4 August 1965.

Early Academic Career
In 1908, Badawi earned his Law License degree from the Egyptian University in Cairo, Egypt. After serving one year as District Attorney in Tanta, Egypt, in 1909 he was sent by the Egyptian Government to France to study for his Doctorate degree which he completed in 1912 at Grenoble University, France. Upon his return to Egypt in 1912, he was appointed Law Professor at the Egyptian University in Cairo, Egypt where he served until 1916.

Professional Career in Egypt
In 1916, Badawi joined the Ministry of Justice where he served until 1920 as deputy director of the Egyptian Courts Division. Subsequently, he was selected to serve in key government positions which included: civil courts judge, secretary general of the council of ministers, councilor at the Litigation of the State (Contentieux de l'etat) Court (when he participated in drafting the 1923 Egyptian Constitution), head of the Litigation of the State Court (1926-1940), Minister of Finance (1940-1942), and minister of foreign affairs (1945-1946). In 1945 he headed the Egyptian delegation to the UN Conference on International Organization and was co-signor of the UN Charter on 26 June 1945.

International career
In 1946, Badawi was elected as judge at the International Court of Justice (ICJ) where he served as judge and Vice President (1955-1958) until his death in 1965. During his career at the ICJ, Dr. Badawi participated in many international contentious cases.

References

 Yapp, M.E., ed., Politics and Diplomacy in Egypt: The Diaries of Sir Miles Lampson 1935-1937 (Oriental and African Archives)", Oxford University Press, USA (February 19, 1998), p. 59, 80, 96, 122, 190, 236, 285, 296, 337, 370, 419, 514, 516-518, 731, 736, 742 and 744.
 Arthur Goldschmidt Jr., Biographical Dictionary of Modern Egypt, 2000 Lyme Rienner Publisher, Inc., 
 Africa and International Law; Taking Stock & Moving Forward, Albany Law School, April 12–14, 2012
 Charles Tripp, Contemporary Egypt: Through Egyptian Eyes: Essays in Honour of P. J. Vatikiotis, Routledge 1st Edition (1993), p. 39, 43 and 44
 Redefining the Egyptian Nation, 1930-1945 (Cambridge Middle East Studies), Cambridge University Press (2002), . p. 208
 Charter of the United Nations, June 26, 1945
 Bin Cheng, General Principles of Law as Applied by International Courts and Tribunals (Grotius Classic Reprint Series), Cambridge University Press (2006), p. 232, 233, 270-272, 278 and 323.
 Members of the International Court of Justice

1887 births
1965 deaths
Egyptian pashas
Egyptian expatriates in France
Finance Ministers of Egypt
Foreign ministers of Egypt
International Court of Justice judges
Egyptian judges of United Nations courts and tribunals
20th-century Egyptian judges
Politicians from Alexandria
Members of Academy of the Arabic Language in Cairo